These are the songs that reached number one in the USA on the Top 60 Best Sellers chart (expanded to 75 on June 21, 1958, and 100 on September 13, 1958) in 1958 as published by Cash Box magazine.

See also
1958 in music
List of Hot 100 number-one singles of 1958 (U.S.)

References
http://www.cashboxmagazine.com/archives/50s_files/1958.html

1958
1958 record charts
1958 in American music